The Newfoundland and Labrador Scotties Tournament of Hearts is the Newfoundland and Labrador provincial women's curling tournament. The tournament is run by the Newfoundland and Labrador Curling Association. The winning team represents Newfoundland and Labrador at the Scotties Tournament of Hearts.

Past winners

References

External links
List of winners

Scotties Tournament of Hearts provincial tournaments
Curling in Newfoundland and Labrador